The Condemned is a 1975 Austrian-West German drama film directed by Axel Corti. It was entered into the 9th Moscow International Film Festival.

Cast
 Klaus Rott as Franz
 Wolfgang Hübsch as Abwerber
 Liliana Nelska as Maria
 Bruno Dallansky as Jungbauer
 Sylvia Haider as Erna
 Rudolf Melichar as Diplom-Ingenieur
 Hilde Sochor as Frau Baumeister
 Josef Hauser as Altbauer

References

External links
 

1975 films
1975 drama films
Austrian drama films
West German films
German drama films
1970s German-language films
Films directed by Axel Corti
Films based on Austrian novels
1970s German films